Looking for Eric is a 2009 British-French film about the escape from the trials of modern life that football and its heroes can bring for its fans. It was written by screenwriter Paul Laverty and directed by the English director Ken Loach. The film's cast includes the former professional footballer Eric Cantona and Steve Evets, former bass guitarist with The Fall.

Loach said of the film, "We wanted to deflate the idea of celebrities as more than human. And we wanted to make a film that was enjoying the idea of what you and I would call solidarity, but what others would call support for your friends really, and the old idea that we are stronger as a team than we are as individuals."

Plot

Eric Bishop is a football fanatic postman whose life is descending into crisis. Looking after his granddaughter is bringing him into contact with his ex-wife, Lily, whom he abandoned after the birth of their daughter. At the same time, his stepson Ryan is hiding a gun under the floorboards of his bedroom for a violent drugs baron. At his lowest moments, Bishop considers suicide. But after a short meditation session with fellow postmen in his living room, and smoking cannabis stolen from his stepson, hallucinations bring forth his footballing hero, the famously philosophical Eric Cantona, who gives him advice. His relationship with Lily improves dramatically. Bishop finds the gun and confronts his stepson. Ryan admits to his involvement with the drugs gang, and Bishop attempts to return the gun to the gangster. He is forced to keep it himself, however, when a Rottweiler is set on him in his car. The gangster then posts footage on YouTube of Bishop's humiliation. The entire family is then arrested by the police on a tip-off but they fail to find the gun as it is hidden in the fridge, inside a frozen chicken. Eric Cantona then advises Bishop to seek help from his friends and to 'surprise' himself. Bishop organises 'Operation Cantona', sneaking dozens of fellow Manchester United fans – wearing Cantona masks (including Cantona himself) – into the gangster's house and humiliating him and his family, threatening to put the video of their operation onto YouTube, in turn. The film ends at Bishop's daughter's graduation day, where the family reunites in peace.

Cast

Production
The film was shot on location in Greater Manchester by Loach's company Sixteen Films.

Release

The film competed in the main competition at the 62nd Cannes Film Festival. It had its UK premiere on 1 June in Lowry Outlet Mall in Salford Quays, attended by Eric Cantona, and was the gala presentation at the opening night of the Sydney Film Festival on 3 June.

The film was released in the United Kingdom and Ireland on 12 June. The film was scheduled to be shown at the Melbourne International Film Festival, but five days before opening night Loach withdrew it because the film festival was "in receipt of financial support from the State of Israel".

Screenplay
The book for Looking For Eric is published by Route Publishing. It includes the full screenplay, extra scenes, colour photographs from the film and on set, and introductions from Paul Laverty, Ken Loach, Eric Cantona and production notes from the cast and crew.

Reception
As of January 2020, Looking for Eric has an 85% rating on Rotten Tomatoes from 99 reviews. The film won the Magritte Award for Best Film in Coproduction.

Roger Ebert, who had praised many of Ken Loach's previous works, gave the film two stars out of four.  He said that he was surprised by the break from Loach's previous social realism, although he also said that Cantona was successful in his role.  Ebert said that "Steve Evets uses a Manchester accent so thick that many of the English themselves might not be able to understand it. Eric Cantona, who is French, is easier to understand."  Ebert had in the past defended Loach's use of Yorkshire dialect in the film Kes, which prevented the film from attaining a release in the US as it was not widely understood.

References

External links 

2009 films
2009 comedy-drama films
British association football films
Belgian sports comedy films
English-language French films
English-language Belgian films
English-language Spanish films
English-language Italian films
Films scored by George Fenton
Films directed by Ken Loach
Films set in 2009
Films set in Manchester
Films shot in England
Film4 Productions films
2000s French-language films
Italian sports comedy-drama films
Magritte Award winners
Spanish sports comedy-drama films
British comedy-drama films
French association football films
Films shot in Greater Manchester
2000s English-language films
Belgian sports drama films
Belgian comedy-drama films
2000s British films
2000s French films